Hans Martna (16 March 1890 Tartu – 3 November 1941 Solikamsk, Russia) was an Estonian politician. He was a member of Estonian Constituent Assembly. He was also the Secretary of the assembly.

References

1890 births
1941 deaths
Members of the Estonian Constituent Assembly
People from Tartu
20th-century Estonian lawyers
Estonian people who died in Soviet detention
People who died in the Gulag
Members of the Riigikogu, 1920–1923